Timothy White or Tim White may refer to:

 Timothy White (abduction victim) (1974–2010), American abducted as a child
 Timothy White (photographer), American celebrity photographer 
 Timothy White (writer) (1952–2002), American rock music journalist
 Timothy White, ship's chandler and pharmacist; founder of British retailer Timothy Whites
 Timothy J. White, United States Navy vice admiral
 Timothy P. White (born 1949), American university chancellor and kinesiologist
 Tim White (American football) (born 1994), American football wide receiver
 Tim White (artist) (1952–2020), British SF artist and book illustrator
 Tim White (newscaster/reporter) (born 1950), American news anchor and investigative reporter
 Tim White (referee) (1954–2022), American wrestling referee
 Tim D. White (born 1950), American paleoanthropologist

See also  
 White (surname)

White, Timothy